The Skyrunner Powerful is a Russian paramotor that was designed and produced by Skyrunner Paramotor Laboratory of Pskov for powered paragliding. Now out of production, when it was available the aircraft was supplied complete and ready-to-fly.

Design and development
The Powerful was designed to comply with the US FAR 103 Ultralight Vehicles rules as well as European regulations. It features a paraglider-style wing, single-place accommodation and a single  Zanzottera MZ 34 engine in pusher configuration with a 2:1 ratio reduction drive and a  diameter two-bladed wooden propeller.

A smaller reduction drive ratio and two corresponding propellers were also offered as factory options.

As is the case with all paramotors, take-off and landing is accomplished by foot. Inflight steering is accomplished via handles that actuate the canopy brakes, creating roll and yaw.

Specifications (Powerful)

References

Powerful
1990s Russian ultralight aircraft
Single-engined pusher aircraft
Paramotors